Adnan Al Kakoun (born 1967) is a Lebanese journalist and businessman. As of 2019, he has over two decades of experience in politics.

Early years

Adnan was born in Beirut, Lebanon in 1967.

Career
Adnan began his career in Al Anwar then moved to Al-Anbaa until 1996-1997, before he moved to Al-Qabas for around 20 Years. He also worked in Al-Jarida for a short period of time. 
He also directs/produces documentary movies that are broadcast in most of the Arab world but primarily on Murr Television.

References
http://www.aljarida.com/articles/1462409621574629400/
http://www.kt.com.kw/read/news/%D8%A7%D9%84%D9%82%D8%A7%D9%82%D9%88%D9%86-%D9%8A%D9%86%D8%B6%D9%85-%D8%A5%D9%84%D9%89-%D8%A3%D8%B3%D8%B1%D8%A9-%D8%A7%D9%84%D8%AC%D8%B1%D9%8A%D8%AF%D8%A9
https://web.archive.org/web/20161019021837/http://kw.alyuwm.com/detail10192.html

Lebanese journalists
Living people
1967 births
Lebanese television presenters
Lebanese University alumni